The painted ringtail possum or moss-forest ringtail possum (Pseudochirulus forbesi) is a species of marsupial in the family Pseudocheiridae. It is found in Papua New Guinea.

Names
It is known as skoyd or boñay in the Kalam language of Papua New Guinea.

References

Possums
Mammals described in 1887
Taxa named by Oldfield Thomas
Taxonomy articles created by Polbot
Marsupials of New Guinea